Brzezice  is a village in the administrative district of Gmina Piaski, within Świdnik County, Lublin Voivodeship, in eastern Poland.

Notable people
 Karolina Michalczuk, Polish boxer

References

Villages in Świdnik County